Tropical Storm Alice was the first tropical cyclone in the Atlantic Ocean to receive a female name. It was a rare off-season tropical cyclone that hit Central America, Cuba, and Florida in late May to early June 1953. Alice formed on May 25 in the western Caribbean, and executed a large loop over Central America. It passed over western Cuba, causing heavy rainfall and possibly several casualties from drowning. Although heavy rainfall occurred in Florida, there was little damage.

Meteorological history

In May and June 1953, an unusually long-lasting upper-level low persisted across Mexico and Central America. On May 25, a weak warm-core surface circulation developed east of Nicaragua. It moved around the upper-level low, bringing it to the northwest and later looping to the south through Honduras and Central America. The system weakened over land, but it re-intensified over the western Caribbean Sea, moving over western Cuba as a  tropical storm on May 31. Advisories for Alice did not begin until June 1, when the storm entered the Gulf of Mexico.

Alice weakened quickly to minimal tropical storm status, due to interaction with a cold front off Florida. It deteriorated so much that advisories were discontinued, with Miami Weather Bureau meteorologist James George remarking that "no danger [existed there] whatsoever." After again passing near the Cuban coast, Alice turned to the northwest and began re-strengthening. The storm again weakened as it approached the Florida peninsula, and Alice made landfall just west of Panama City Beach on June 6 as a minimal tropical storm. It dissipated shortly thereafter.

Impact and records

While the storm was in the vicinity of western Cuba, it produced heavy rainfall, which broke a nine-month drought. The rainfall caused flooding, and there were unconfirmed reports of several deaths due to drowning.

When advisories first began on the storm, the National Hurricane Center issued storm warnings from Key West through Tarpon Springs on the west coast of Florida; at the same time, the agency posted small craft warnings for the east coast up through Palm Beach. The rains ended a dry spell in the state. Along the Florida panhandle, workers tied down planes in local Air Force and Naval bases. No evacuations were ordered, and the primary impact was in the form of light rain. There were no reports of damage in the state.

From 1950 to 1952, Atlantic hurricanes were named using the Joint Army/Navy Phonetic Alphabet. Before the 1953 season, officials changed the system to using female names; hence, Alice was the first in the new format. Male names would not be used until 1979. The name "Alice" was later reused twice in 1954 for a hurricane in June and December, as well as for a hurricane in 1973.

See also

1953 Atlantic hurricane season

References

External links
National Hurricane Center
Monthly Weather Review for 1953

1953 Atlantic hurricane season
Atlantic tropical storms
Hurricanes in Cuba
Hurricanes in Florida
Off-season Atlantic tropical cyclones